The 1932–33 Scottish Cup was the 55th staging of Scotland's most prestigious football knockout competition. The Cup was won by Celtic who defeated Motherwell in the final.

Fourth round

Semi-finals

Replays

Final

Teams

See also 
 1932–33 in Scottish football
 1931 Scottish Cup Final (played between same teams)

References

Scottish Cup seasons
1932 in association football
1933 in association football
Cup
Scot